Romagnol or Romagnolo is the demonym of Romagna, may refer to:

Romagnol dialects
Romagnolo donkey
Romagnolo (grape variety) (see Cerveteri)
 Credito Romagnolo, a defunct subsidiary of Credito Italiano, a predecessor of UniCredit